Allal Ben Abdellah (615) is a SIGMA 9813 frigate of the Royal Moroccan Navy. The ship is the last of three SIGMA multi-mission frigates ordered by Morocco from Damen Schelde Naval Shipbuilding, entering service in 2012.

Design and description 
The ship has a complement of 91 personnel.

The ship is armed with one OTO Melara 76 mm/62 gun and two 20 mm modèle F2 guns. For surface warfare, Allal Ben Abdellah are equipped with four Exocet MM40 Block 3 anti-ship missile launchers and twelve vertical launching system cells for MBDA MICA anti-aircraft missiles. For anti-submarine warfare, she is equipped with two three-tube B515 torpedo tubes for MU90 Impact torpedo.

Her sensors and electronic systems consisted of Thales SMART-S Mk2 air/surface surveillance radar, Thales LIROD Mk2 radar/electro-optical fire-control system, Thales KINGKLIP UMS 4132 sonar, Thales TACTICOS combat management system, Thales TSB 2520 IFF, two navigation radars, Thales VIGILE 100 ESM system, Thales SCORPION radar electronic countermeasure, and two TERMA SKWS chaff launchers.

Allal Ben Abdellah also has a hangar and flight deck for a 9 tonnes helicopter. The ship also has two rigid-hulled inflatable boats.

Construction and career 
Royal Moroccan Navy signed a contract with Damen on 6 February 2008 for three SIGMA frigates, also referred to as "Moroccan multi-mission frigates", with the contract value estimated to be US$1.2 billion. The third frigate, which is a SIGMA 9813 design, was laid down in September 2009 at Damen shipyard in Vlissingen, Netherlands. The ship was launched in October 2011. The ship completed sea trials in June 2012.

Allal Ben Abdellah was transferred to the Royal Moroccan Navy and commissioned on 8 September 2012 in Rotterdam, coinciding with the 35th World Port Days event held in the city. In the next three weeks the ship's crew undergo Sail Safety Training in Den Helder and the North Sea, assisted by Royal Netherlands Navy personnel. At the conclusion of the training course in late September 2012, the frigate started her maiden voyage to Morocco.

References

External links

2011 ships
Ships built in Vlissingen
Frigates of the Royal Moroccan Navy